Zoque may refer to:

 Zoque people, an indigenous people of Mexico
 Zoque languages, a group of languages of southern Mexico
 Selva Zoque, a rainforest in Mexico
 Zoque (dish), a dish of Andalusia

Language and nationality disambiguation pages